"Thunder on Sycamore Street" is a 1960 Australian television play directed by David Cahill. It was based on a script by Reginald Rose.

It followed production of The Grey Nurse Said Nothing as part of General Motors Hour. Like that production it starred Frank Waters.

Plot
The residents of Sycamore Street are upset when they discover a new neighbour has served a prison sentence.

Cast
Frank Waters as Joseph Blake
Joe McCormick		
Muriel Steinbeck
John Brunskill
Richard Davies as the man of conscience
James Fallows		
Brett Hart		
Benita Harvey		
Mary Hoskin		
Therese Macrae		
Verity Marina		
Terry McDermott		
Ida Newton		
Moya O'Sullivan		
Max Osbiston		
Ivor Bromley

Production
The drama was produced in ATN 7 Studio "A" at its Television Centre, Epping. This studio is the largest production studio for TV in Australia. The major set, representing the exteriors of three homes, covered 2,000 square feet. It was the largest single set ever installed at the ATN studios, and ATN production executives said it was the biggest single set ever made for Australian "live" TV. A further 600 feet was allowed for the roadway and for camera movement. As all three houses in which the action of the play was set were identical, a second basic set was used. This covered about 500 additional feet of studio space.

It was one of the last appearances of Muriel Steinbeck.

The play had been performed on Australian radio in 1959.

Reception
The TV critic for the Sydney Morning Herald said the production "gave audiences something to think about" and was "careful enough, although evidences of pinch-pennyism were apparent... Frank Waters... stood head and shoulders over a comparatively indifferent cast."

See also
List of television plays broadcast on ATN-7

References

External links

Thunder of Sycamore Street at National Film and Sound Archive

1960 television plays
1960s Australian television plays
1960 Australian television episodes
The General Motors Hour